= La Russie opprimée =

- Type: Weekly
- Editor: Alexander Kerensky, O. Minor, V. Zenzinov
- Founded: 1926
- Ceased publication: 1933
- Political alignment: Social-Revolutionary
- Language: French language
- Headquarters: 9 bis Rue Vineuse, Paris (48°51′33.4″N 2°17′2.6″E)
- OCLC number: 32282792

La Russie opprimée ('Oppressed Russia') was a French language weekly publication, issued exiled Russian Social-Revolutionaries in Paris 1926–1933. La Russie opprimée was launched by Alexander Kerensky in 1926. The newspaper contained analysis of Soviet culture and politics, reviews of the Soviet press and polemics against pro-Soviet personalities in France. It carried the by-line 'Weekly socialist information bulletin'. Apart from Kerensky, other editors included O. Minor and V. Zenzinov. The office of La Russie opprimée was located in the 16th arrondissement of Paris.
